Kang Oe-jeong (born 2 September 1966) is a South Korean para table tennis player. She won a team bronze medal at the 2016 Summer Paralympics in women's Class 4–5 at age 50. 

Her disability is congenital. 

She also competed in wheelchair curling, and represented South Korea at the 2011 World Wheelchair Curling Championship.

References 
 

1966 births 
Paralympic medalists in table tennis
South Korean female table tennis players 
Table tennis players at the 2016 Summer Paralympics 
Medalists at the 2016 Summer Paralympics 
Paralympic table tennis players of South Korea
Living people
Sportspeople from South Gyeongsang Province
People from Haman County
Paralympic bronze medalists for South Korea
South Korean female curlers
South Korean wheelchair curlers